The 8th Writers Guild of America Awards honored the best film writers of 1955. Winners were announced in 1956.

Winners & Nominees

Film 
Winners are listed first highlighted in boldface.

Special Awards

References

External links 

 WGA.org

1952
W
Writers Guild of America Awards
Writers Guild of America Awards